Albert Richmond "Boo" Morcom (May 1, 1921 – October 3, 2012) was an American track and field athlete.

Early career
He was born in Braintree, Massachusetts. While he is primarily known for his exploits in the pole vault event, he has demonstrated versatility in other events including long jump and high jump. He set several records at Braintree High School.

At the age of 19 he was the best pole vaulter in the state of Massachusetts. He became known as "the Barefoot Boy" for his habit of high jumping with one shoe on and one shoe off. Then when he matriculated to the University of New Hampshire under coach Paul Sweet, the Boston newspaper sport pages would refer to him as "One Shoe Boo". His fame spread as he pole vaulted on an athletic tour of Canada with three other athletes including Babe Ruth. In 1940 he took his athletic skills to the University of New Hampshire, where his record in the long jump lasted for 67 years.

His studies were interrupted by World War II.  Before departing for the conflict, he won the 1942 United States National Championships in the pole vault. He finished in second place in the high jump.  He returned to UNH to become the 1947 NCAA pole vault champion.

In 1950, he was recalled to the Army's 101st Airborne Division "Screaming Eagles" as an officer and Jumpmaster for the Korean War.

Olympics

Morcom competed in the pole vault at the 1948 Summer Olympics for the United States, finishing in 6th place after passing at lesser heights, then during a rainstorm, missing at the height the eventual winners would clear of 4.20 meters. A week later he beat the winning height by 6 inches. In 1949 he won his third United States national championship.

He graduated with a degree in biology and went on to coach Track and Field at the University of Pennsylvania for 35 years before returning to coach in New Hampshire.  He started one of the first high school track teams for girls in 1954 and opened the Penn athletic facilities to poor minority high school students.  In 1956, he was the coach of the USA Women's Olympic Track Team.

Masters
Morcom continued to compete in athletics as he advanced in age, competing in college meets through his 40s.  As an early pioneer of masters athletics, he held the world record for the pole vault as he passed through each of the age divisions between age 50 and 70, plus world records in the high jump, long jump, decathlon, and pentathlon. He continued to vault past age 75, still ranked number one.

Due to the advent of fiberglass vaulting poles, his world record in the M55 division was higher than his best vault in the Olympics almost three decades earlier.

He became well known for these activities, encountering, by his recollection, Jesse Owens, Wilt Chamberlain, and Jackie Robinson. He appeared on The Bob Hope Show. He was inducted into the USATF Masters Hall of Fame in 1997. He is also in the Braintree High School Athletic Hall of Fame, the UNH Athletic Hall of Fame, the Pole Vault Hall of Fame, the Massachusetts Track Coaches Hall of Fame, and as a coach in the Women's Track and Field Hall of Fame.

In 1987, at the age of 66, he was still able to jump 12'6" in the pole vault, as high as any high school athlete in the state of New Hampshire. He was awarded the New Hampshire Male Athlete of the Year Trophy.

Author and historian
Morcom was a member of Mensa International.  He wrote articles on a range of subjects, from the Hale family of New Hampshire to detailed antique bottles.

References

1921 births
2012 deaths
Olympic track and field athletes of the United States
American masters athletes
World record setters in athletics (track and field)
American male pole vaulters
University of New Hampshire alumni
Athletes (track and field) at the 1948 Summer Olympics
World record holders in masters athletics
Mensans
People from Braintree, Massachusetts
United States Army personnel of World War II
United States Army personnel of the Korean War
Braintree High School alumni
United States Army officers
Military personnel from Massachusetts